The following is a list of Nippon Professional Baseball players with the last name starting with I, retired or active.

I

References

External links
Japanese Baseball

 I